Rainford is a village and civil parish in the Metropolitan Borough of St Helens, Merseyside, England,  north of St Helens. At the 2011 Census, the population was 7,779.

Within the boundaries of the historic county of Lancashire, the earliest record of the village was in 1189.

History
Rainford is well known for its industrial past when it was a major manufacturer of clay smoking pipes. The nearby coal mines became worked out and closed before the Second World War.

Until the mid-1960s, it was also a location for sand excavation, for use in the glass factories of St Helens.

The Rookery is a large 17th-century manor house which was formerly a school and workhouse.

Geography

Rainford lies on a fertile agricultural plain and is effectively an urban island surrounded by large scale farming, mainly arable, but with some livestock herds.

The village consists of two main sections – the main body of the village, centred on the parish church; and Rainford Junction, a smaller settlement which has grown up around Rainford railway station. The two parts of the village are separated by a band of farmland, although they come close to meeting at the village's north-western end.

There are three smaller villages which are near to Rainford – King's Moss to the east, Crawford to the north-east and Crank to the south-east.

Industry
Agriculture has been a constant since time immemorial around Rainford.

From the mid-17th century Rainford was a centre of clay pipe manufacture. C.J. Berry speculates that this may have been due to the prevalence of Catholics in the industry, and Rainford's history of Nonconformism and religious tolerance, in contrast to the persecution Catholics received in much of the country in the era. The type of clay used was only generally found in Devon and Cornwall, and was thus imported. The industry in the area peaked during the period c. 1800–40, in which there was little else in the village besides the clay pipe industry. Whilst other towns in the area made pipes, the industry in Rainford started earlier and continued longer. The last two pipe manufacturers retired in 1956. The clay industry continued in the area thereafter, though, with the Rainford Potteries (established 1890) making earthenware drainpipes from local clay.

Transport
Rainford Junction is so called because it contained the junction between the Liverpool & Bury Railway's Skelmersdale Branch and St Helens Railway, and is now home to the village's only railway station. The railway station is on the Kirkby – Manchester Victoria via Wigan line. Passengers wishing to travel to Liverpool must change at Kirkby onto the Merseyrail electrified line. Rainford Village railway station, located on Cross Pit Lane, served the centre of the village from 1858 until closure in 1951. It was located on the line to St Helens Shaw Street railway station.

Rainford sits alongside the A570 (Rainford Bypass), a dual carriageway constructed in the late 1930s to supplant the original route running through the village centre. The A570 connects at one end to the East Lancashire Road (A580) and, at the other end, the M58 motorway. This results in excellent road links, and the village therefore has many inhabitants who commute to the nearby cities of Liverpool and Manchester and to St Helens.

There are bus services in Rainford; as at November 2015 Arriva North West operate service 38 which connects the village and Rainford Junction to St Helens every 30 minutes. Evening and Sunday journeys on this service are numbered 356 and go via Crank approximately hourly. HTL Buses operate the 152 from St Helens to Rainford with a few services extended to Ormskirk. The 157 goes to Ashton and is currently operated by Cumfybus.

Culture and recreation
Rainford has many noted public houses, including the Bottle and Glass, the Junction Hotel, the Star Inn, the Derby Arms, the Golden Lion, and the Eagle and Child. It is also home to the George Wright Brewery.

Annually the village has a music festival called Picnic in the Park; profits benefit Rainford Rangers, the local football team. The 2018 headline was John Coghlan (drummer)'s Quo. The 2019 headline was Carol Decker's T'Pau (band). 2020's event was postponed until 2021 due to the COVID-19 pandemic.

Rainford Silver Band is highly regarded, and has won many contests  A 'walking day' takes place every year in June and a fairground is set up behind the Golden Lion public house, in which the silver band participate. A well-supported Rainford Show is held each year in early September in the old Rainford Urban District Council offices, with competitive classes for handicrafts, flowers, vegetables, floral art, photography etc.

Religion
Rainford currently has three functioning churches, with the Catholic, Church of England and United Reformed denominations having one each. There is also a nondenominational chapel in nearby Crank. The area has a history of Nonconformism, and was a stronghold of Recusancy from the Reformation until the Catholic Emancipation Act of 1832.

Education
Rainford is also noted for its schools. It currently has three primary schools and a secondary school with a large sixth form. The primary schools are Rainford Brook Lodge County Primary School, Rainford C of E Primary School and Rainford Corpus Christi Catholic Primary School. The high school and sixth form operate jointly as Rainford High School, and serve to educate pupils not just from Rainford, but from throughout St. Helens and beyond. Many pupils continue to university each year. The high school has recently been partnered with Guangdong University, in southern China.

Sports
There is currently a golf course called the Northwest National Golf Club alongside the A570 dual carriageway. This new course contains 18 holes, a golf academy, restaurant and conference centre and was opened in the summer of 2009.

Rainford also has various sports clubs; A.F.C. Rainford, Rainford Tennis club 'Rainford Storm' Table Tennis Club, Rainford Rangers F.C., Rainford Eagles F.C., Rainford North End F.C. and Rainford Cricket Club.
A speedway training track was operational at some time in the early 1950s.

Notable People

Janice Long, BBC Radio 2 presenter
Keith Chegwin, TV presenter and sometime singer
William Birch, professional footballer
Louis Bimpson, professional footballer
Eric Frodsham, rugby league fullback, lived in the village
James Bradshaw, dissenting minister, lived and preached in the village
Marwan Koukash, owner of Salford RLFC, lives in Rainford
Claire Anderson, attended Rainford High School
Jack Wilson, one of the 3 remaining Lancaster Bomber Pilots.

See also
List of mining disasters in Lancashire

References

External links

General
 Rainford Local website

Schools
 Rainford Brook Lodge County Primary School
 Rainford C of E Primary School
 Rainford Corpus Christi Primary School
 Rainford High Technology College

Other relevant sites
 Rainford Silver Band
 George Wright Brewery
 The Northwest National Golf Club
 Rainford Tennis Club
 

 
Towns and villages in the Metropolitan Borough of St Helens
Civil parishes in Merseyside
Liverpool Urban Area